WMVG (1450 AM) is a radio station broadcasting an adult contemporary/local information format.  Licensed to Milledgeville, Georgia, United States, the station is currently owned by Kristopher Kendrick, through licensee Oconee Communications Company, LLC, and features programming from ABC News Radio, Georgia News Network, Oconee Sports Network, Atlanta Braves Radio Network and Georgia Tech Sports Network.

Previous logo
  (WMVG's logo under previous ESPN Radio affiliation)

References

External links

MVG